Sodium metatungstate is the inorganic compound with the formula Na6[H2W12O40], sometimes written 3Na2WO4·9WO3·H2O.  It also called as sodium polytungstate (SPT).  This salt has been used in the manufacture of dense aqueous solutions. Sodium metatungstate exists as white solid. The anion is the polyoxotungstate [H2W12O40]6-, which features six-coordinated tungsten(VI) centers interconnected with doubly- and triply bridging oxo ligands.

Due to its very high solubility in water (max. density 3.1 g/cm3), SPT is widely used as to produce "heavy liquid" for gravity separation (sink /float analysis) and density gradient centrifugation. It has significant advantages when compared to zinc chloride solution or the toxic halogenated carbons for sink-swim analysis. Aqueous SPT is non-toxic (unlike the denser Clerici solution), non-flammable, odorless, reusable and additionally it has a low viscosity.

References

Further reading

Sodium compounds
Tungstates